Cold-water geysers are geysers that have eruptions whose water spurts are propelled by -bubbles, instead of the hot steam  which drives the more familiar hot-water geysers: The gush of a cold-water geyser is identical to the spurt from a freshly-opened bottle of soda pop.
Cold-water geysers look quite similar to their steam-driven counterparts; however, their -laden water often appears whiter and more frothy.

Mechanism
The more familiar hot-water geysers derive the energy for their eruptons from the proximity to (relatively) near-surface magma. The magnitude and frequency of such eruptions depend on various factors such as plumbing depth,  concentrations and refresh rate, aquifer water yield, etc.

The water and its load of  powering a cold-water geyser can escape the rock strata overlying its aquifer only through weak segments of rock, like faults, joints, or drilled wells.
The column of water rising through the rock exerts enough pressure on the gaseous  so that it remains in the water as dissolved gas or small bubbles. When the pressure decreases due to the widening of a fissure, the  bubbles expand, and that expansion displaces the water above and causes the eruption.

Examples

The best known cold-water geysers are probably
 Saratoga Springs, New York, 
 Crystal Geyser, near Green River, Utah.
Other cold-water geysers include
 in the municipality of Caxambu, Brazil,
 in the village of Herľany, Slovakia,
 a very small geyser in Sivá Brada, Slovakia,
 Wallender Born (a.k.a. Brubbel), Germany,
 Wehr Geyser Germany,
 Andernach Geyser (a.k.a. Namedyer Sprudel), Germany.

References
 

 
 
Springs (hydrology)
Bodies of water